The Prince and the Pauper is a British action adventure film of 2000 directed by Giles Foster, based on the 1881 novel The Prince and the Pauper by Mark Twain. It stars Alan Bates, Aidan Quinn, and the twin brothers Jonathan and Robert Timmins as the lookalikes Edward VI of England and Tom Canty.

Plot
In the 16th-century City of London, a poor boy called Tom Canty is bullied by his criminal father into stealing five shillings from a stranger. He is chased and escapes by getting through a gate into a palace garden. There, he meets and befriends Edward, Prince of Wales. They find they look very alike and that each craves the life of the other, so they swap clothes. Edward is then mistaken for Tom and marched out of the palace by guards. A stranger, Sir Miles Hendon (Aidan Quinn), meets the boy and takes him to join Tom's father, John Canty. They fight, and Canty believes he has killed Miles, so flees from London into the country, taking Edward with him. Meanwhile, in the palace, Tom does not know how to play the part of a prince and reveals who he is to the scheming Lord Hertford (Jonathan Hyde). Edward's father, Henry VIII, (Alan Bates) falls seriously ill, and after giving orders that no one is to go on doubting that Tom is his son, he dies. Tom is accepted by the court as king. 
Word of these developments reaches John Canty and Edward, on the run, before Canty is killed in a fight. Edward again meets Miles, recovered and very much alive, who takes him to Hendon Hall, his family seat, where they find Miles's younger brother Hugh has seized his property. Hugh imprisons Miles and Edward, but they escape, and Edward persuades Miles that he is not Tom but the new king.

On the day of the coronation, Edward and Miles travel to Westminster. Edward is able to halt the ceremony, and he and Tom are again able to exchange their clothes and identities. Archbishop Cranmer and others are suspicious, but Edward produces the Great Seal of the Realm to prove who he is. Afterwards, Edward gives Tom an official position, and Miles is restored to his lost honours.

Cast

Aidan Quinn as Sir Miles Hendon
Jonathan Timmins as Prince Edward
 Robert Timmins as Tom Canty
Alan Bates as King Henry VIII
Ian Redford as John Canty
Alison Newman as Ann Canty
Jonathan Hyde as Lord Hertford
Tim Potter as Chief Gentleman
James Greene as Archbishop Cranmer
Perdita Weeks as Lady Jane Grey
James Saxon as Abbot
Lajos Balázsovits as High Sheriff
Paul Brooke as Magistrate
Ruth Platt as Sarah 
János Gyuriska as Hugh Hendon
Márta Bakó as Grandmother Canty
Gyula Mesterházy as Prince's Servant
László Áron as Court Physician
 Michael Mehlmann as Gentleman of the Balm
Luke Smith as Kitchen Boy
Aaron Keeling as Daniel Hunter
Sam Jones as Stephen Bartlett
Joanna Bacon as Woman with Applecart
Sándor Téri as Bystander
Zoltán Gera as Merchant
Zoltán Bezerédy as Ruffian
Piroska Molnár as Farmer's Wife
Laszlo Gorog as Magistrate's Clerk
Ben O'Brien as Constable
Tibor Szervét as Palace Guard

Production
The use of twin brothers to play Tom and the Prince echoes the casting of Billy and Bobby Mauch in a previous production starring Erroll Flynn, The Prince and the Pauper (1937).

The picture was filmed on location in and around Budapest, Hungary, and most of the minor roles were played by local Hungarian actors.

See also
Cultural depictions of Edward VI of England
Cultural depictions of Henry VIII of England

Notes

External links

The Prince and the Pauper at tudorplace.com.ar

2000 films
2000s historical adventure films
Films about Henry VIII
British historical adventure films
English-language Hungarian films
Prince and the Pauper 2000
Films set in London
Films set in palaces
Cultural depictions of Edward VI of England
Hungarian historical films
Films directed by Giles Foster
2000s English-language films
2000s British films